Mount Cis is a hill,  high, located  northeast of Cape Barne in western Ross Island. It was named by the British Antarctic Expedition, 1907–09, at the suggestion of geologist Raymond Priestley, after one of the expeditionary dogs.

References 

Mountains of Ross Island